Juan Manuel Vázquez may refer to:

 Juan Manuel Vázquez (footballer), Argentine forward for Barracas Central
 Juan Manuel Vázquez (handballer), Argentine handballer at the 2012 Summer Olympics